Lincoln Park is a census-designated place (CDP) in Upson County, Georgia, United States. The population was 1,122 at the 2000 census.

Geography

Lincoln Park is located at  (32.867666, -84.332046).

Demographics

As of the census of 2000, there were 1,122 people, 450 households, and 298 families residing in the CDP. The racial makeup of the CDP was 4.55% White, 95.01% African American, 0.09% Native American, 0.27% Asian, and 0.09% from two or more races. Hispanic or Latino of any race were 0.80% of the population.

There were 450 households, out of which 26.0% had children under the age of 18 living with them, 23.6% were married couples living together, 36.2% had a female householder with no husband present, and 33.6% were non-families. 28.7% of all households were made up of individuals, and 9.6% had someone living alone who was 65 years of age or older.  The average household size was 2.49 and the average family size was 3.09.

In the CDP, the population was spread out, with 24.9% under the age of 18, 9.9% from 18 to 24, 26.6% from 25 to 44, 24.6% from 45 to 64, and 14.1% who were 65 years of age or older.  The median age was 37 years. For every 100 females, there were 90.5 males.  For every 100 females age 18 and over, there were 85.3 males.

The median income for a household in the CDP was $20,085, and the median income for a family was $24,150. Males had a median income of $23,472 versus $18,542 for females. The per capita income for the CDP was $15,161.  About 20.1% of families and 31.5% of the population were below the poverty line, including 53.4% of those under age 18 and 23.6% of those age 65 or over.

References

Census-designated places in Georgia (U.S. state)
Census-designated places in Upson County, Georgia